

Life
Syed Sirajuddin Muhammad, the son and successor of Syed Burhanuddin Qutub-e-Alam, came to be called by the title of Shah-e-Alam, king of the world. His father Sheikh Burhanuddin, also known as Qutub-e-Alam, was the grandson of Syed Makhdoom Jehaniya Jehan Gasht. He arrived in Gujarat during the beginning of the fifteenth century during rule of Ahmed Shah I, settling on the outskirts of Ahmedabad of Gujarat

Following the Suharwardi tradition, the family established close contact with the Gujarat Sultanate and later with Mughal rulers and played an active role in the social and political life of the city.

Shah e Alam, the eleventh among twelve sons, assisted his father, Qutub-e-Alam. An interesting miracle happened one day; while bathing in a water body, his feet hit upon something. The Shaikh remarked that he didn’t know whether the object was stone, iron or wood. Miraculously, the object turned into a mixture of the three materials and became a venerated relic.

Shah Alam was related to the royal houses of Sindh and Gujarat through marriage to Bibi Marqi, the second daughter of Jam Saheb of Sindh.

He spent six days a week in solitary meditation and received visitors only on Fridays, when open discussions were held.  An account of the Friday gatherings was compiled in a seven volume manual titled, 'Kunuz-e-Muhammadi’ by Shaykh Farid bin Daulat Shah Jilwani. The account is not traceable today.

He died on 20 Jumada al akhira 880 Hijri/1475 AD. The mausoleum was built by Taj Kham Narpali and now known as Shah-e-Alam's Roza.

See also
 Shah-e-Alam's Roza, the mausoleum and the mosque complex dedicated to him
 Qutub-e-Alam's Mosque at Vatva

Notes

History of Ahmedabad
Indian Sufi saints
Year of birth unknown
14th-century deaths
Dargahs in India